Campagnola Cremasca is a comune (municipality) in the Province of Cremona in the Italian region Lombardy, located about  east of Milan and about  northwest of Cremona.

Campagnola Cremasca borders the following municipalities: Capralba, Casaletto Vaprio, Crema, Cremosano, Pianengo, Sergnano.

References

Cities and towns in Lombardy